Das Luxemburger Land was a newspaper published in Luxembourg between 1882 and 1887.

Defunct newspapers published in Luxembourg
German-language newspapers published in Luxembourg
1882 in Luxembourg
1887 in Luxembourg
Publications established in 1882
Publications disestablished in 1887